The women's triple jump event at the 2000 Asian Athletics Championships was held in Jakarta, Indonesia on 28 August.

Results

References

2000 Asian Athletics Championships
Triple jump at the Asian Athletics Championships
2000 in women's athletics